Iceland elects on a national level a ceremonial head of state—the president—and a legislature. The president is elected for a four-year term by the people. The parliament (Alþingi) has 63 members, elected for a four-year term by proportional representation using the D'Hondt method with a closed list. Iceland has a multi-party system, with numerous parties in which no one party typically has a chance of gaining power alone which typically results in a hung parliament, so parties must work with each other to form coalition governments.

The most recent election was held on 25 September 2021.

Voting

Eligibility
According to Registers Iceland, All Icelandic nationals who have lived abroad for less than eight years are automatically registered to vote as long as they are 18 and have lived in Iceland at some point. Icelandic citizens who lived abroad for more than eight years must register to vote, as long as they are a citizen, at least eighteen years old, and have had legal domicile in Iceland

Foreign nationals are not allowed to vote in presidential elections, parliamentary elections, or national referendums. Danish nationals who lived in Iceland on 6 March 1946 or any point ten years before that are eligible to vote.

Foreign nationals from Sweden, Denmark, Norway, and Finland can vote in munincipal elections if they have registered their domicile in Iceland before election day. Foreign nationals from other countries have to live in Iceland for three years to vote in these elections.

Schedule

Latest elections

2021 parliamentary elections

2020 presidential election

{| class=wikitable style=text-align:right
!Candidate
!Party
!Votes
!%
|-
|align=left|Guðni Th. Jóhannesson||align=left|Independent||150,913||92.18
|-
|align=left|Guðmundur Franklín Jónsson||align=left|Independent||12,797||7.82
|-
|align=left colspan=2|Invalid/blank votes||5,111||–
|-
|align=left colspan=2|Total||168,821||100
|-
|align=left colspan=2|Registered voters/turnout||252,267||66.92
|-
|align=left colspan=4|Source: RÚV, 
|}

See also
 List of elections in Iceland

References

External links
Adam Carr's Election Archive
Parties and elections
NSD: European Election Database - Iceland publishes regional level election data; allows for comparisons of election results, 1991–2009
Election history